Marthatown is an unincorporated community in Boone County, West Virginia, United States. At one time it was also known as Kelcol.

References 

Unincorporated communities in West Virginia
Unincorporated communities in Boone County, West Virginia